Red Bug is an unincorporated community in Brunswick County, North Carolina, United States.

References 

Unincorporated communities in North Carolina
Unincorporated communities in Brunswick County, North Carolina